Sasca may refer to:

Locations in Romania
Sasca Montană, a commune in Caraş-Severin County, and its village of Sasca Română
Sasca Mică and Sasca Nouă, villages in Cornu Luncii Commune, Suceava County

Other
The Saudi Arabian Society for Culture and Arts, abbreviated SASCA